Laurenţiu Dumitru (born 24 May 1983) is a Romanian footballer who played last time for FC Brașov.

Dumitru has spent most of his career playing for Petrolul Ploieşti, and was one of seven players retained by the club after the 2008–09 season.

References

External links
 
 

1983 births
Living people
Romanian footballers
FC Brașov (1936) players
Association football defenders